The South Cardiff Panthers is an Australian rules football team based in Cardiff, Wales. The club play in the Welsh Australian Rules Football League under a 9-a-side rules format.

History
The South Cardiff Panthers were one of the founding member teams of the WARFL, playing their first season in 2008.

Past Results

From 2012 season onwards:
Win = 4Pts
Draw = 2 Pts
Loss = 1 Pt
Forfeit = 0 Pts

Titles

Honours

Notable players

Andrew Atack, Edward Doe, Mark Horsman, David James (Great Britain Bulldogs)
David Saunders (2010 Euro Cup Team)

2012 Squad

2013 Squad

See also

References

Sport in Cardiff
Australian rules football clubs in Wales
2007 establishments in Wales
Australian rules football clubs established in 2007